Vrchoslavice is a municipality and village in Prostějov District in the Olomouc Region of the Czech Republic. It has about 600 inhabitants.

Administrative parts
The village of Dlouhá Ves is an administrative part of Vrchoslavice.

References

Villages in Prostějov District